Fabio Calcaterra (born May 13, 1965 in Magenta) is an Italian professional football coach and a former player.

Calcaterra played professional football with F.C. Internazionale Milano, S.S. Lazio, A.C. Cesena, Catania Calcio and A.S. Bari.

References

1965 births
Living people
People from Magenta, Lombardy
Italian footballers
Serie A players
Serie B players
A.C.N. Siena 1904 players
S.S. Lazio players
Inter Milan players
A.C. Cesena players
S.S.C. Bari players
S.P.A.L. players
Catania S.S.D. players
U.S. Pergolettese 1932 players
Italian football managers
Benevento Calcio managers
Association football defenders
Footballers from Lombardy
Sportspeople from the Metropolitan City of Milan